The 2011 Assiniboine River flood was caused by above average precipitation in Western Manitoba and Saskatchewan. This was a 1 in 300 year flood that affected much of Western Manitoba. The flooding in Manitoba was expected to mostly involve the 2011 Red River Flood but instead the more severe flooding was found on the Assiniboine in the west.

Early signs
The 2011 flood really started in the fall of 2010 with several major rainfall events and generally wet conditions. Initially, it was predicted that the flood along the Assiniboine River would be similar to the flood of 1995. During the winter of 2010–2011 the Shellmouth Reservoir was emptied in preparation, to store water for the coming spring flood. With more and more precipitation, the estimates on the flood were revised upwards.

The first major settlement to experience the floodwater was St. Lazare, Manitoba which was located near the confluence of the Assiniboine River and Qu'Appelle River. Dikes were built up to protect against the rising floodwater, but unfortunately some residences were not spared as their protective dikes were overwhelmed. The flood continued downstream, spilling over its banks and flooding campgrounds and fields in the flood plain. Brandon, Manitoba's second largest city, prepared well in advance of the anticipated flood building up both earthen dikes as well as sandbag/Hesco bastion dikes. After a heavy snowfall on April 29 and 30 over much of the Assiniboine River watershed the crest forecast for Brandon was revised upward well above the flood of 1976. The 2011 event is estimated to be a 1 in 300-year flood.

Shortly thereafter a state of emergency was declared in Brandon as well as other municipalities across Manitoba. Premier Greg Selinger requested from Prime Minister Stephen Harper troops from the Canadian military to help with the flood fighting efforts. The last time the military was called in to help fight a flood in Manitoba was the 1997 Red River flood.

Downstream of Brandon, the Manitoba Government forecast that between 54000-56000 cu ft/s of water would enter into the Portage Diversion reservoir near Portage la Prairie. This amount of water would overwhelm the dikes downstream, along the Assiniboine River, which were only built to allow for a channel capacity of about 10,000-11,000 cu ft/s before spilling over. Otherwise breaching of dikes would occur.

On June 22, 2011 the city of Minot in North Dakota issued an evacuation of 12,000 residents due to the swollen Souris River that flows through the city. The Souris River starts in Saskatchewan and makes its way south across the border and then back north into Manitoba. The Souris River then eventually joins up with the Assiniboine River past Brandon which could again raise water levels on the Assiniboine due to the swollen Souris and the possibility of Lake Manitoba raising up again. Preparations are under way for the communities along the Souris to raise dikes and evacuations have begun. The province has said it will push the limits of the flood protection again.

Intentional breach and flooding
It was determined by the Manitoba government that the capacity could be increased to 32000-34000 cu ft/s by building up the banks of the Portage Diversion, depending on hydraulic resistance on bridges along the channel. This would reduce the flows on the Assiniboine River somewhat, but still not enough for the dikes to hold. It was also determined that a controlled release of water from the Assiniboine in the range of 2000–6000 cu ft/s should be created downstream of the Portage Diversion in order to reduce flows on the river, and divert the water into the La Salle River watershed, resulting in more manageable river levels along the Assiniboine River. The exact location decided on was at the Hoop and Holler Bend.

Military personnel were assigned to build flood protection in Brandon, on the Assiniboine River west of Portage la Prairie, and for residences that were at risk of flooding due to the controlled breach.

The intentional breach and overland flooding began on Saturday May, 14. The resultant flooding was very slow moving and was expected to take several days to reach the La Salle River. The waters intentionally spilled from the Assiniboine were expected to cover  and flood a possible 150 homes.

Effects on Lake Manitoba
With the diversion of water from the Assiniboine using the Portage Diversion into Lake Manitoba, the water level on the lake increased. Increasing the capacity of the Diversion put surrounding residences in danger of being flooded, also prompting an evacuation of Delta Beach on Lake Manitoba. This led to flood fighting efforts shifting from the Assiniboine River to Lake Manitoba.
However, the rise occurred in weeks, rather than years as would occur in natural conditions.

References

Assiniboine River flood
Assiniboine River
Floods in Canada
Natural disasters in Manitoba
2011 disasters in Canada
Assiniboine